Ahmadabad (also Romanized as Aḩmadābād; also known as Aḩmadābād-e Khafrak, Khāledābād, and Khālidābād) is a village in Rudbal Rural District, in the Central District of Marvdasht County, Fars Province, Iran. At the 2006 census, its population was 152, in 41 families.

References 

Populated places in Marvdasht County